Antigua and Barbuda Time (AST) is the official time in Antigua and Barbuda.  It is four hours behind Coordinated Universal Time (UTC−04:00). Antigua and Barbuda has only one time zone and does not observe daylight saving time.

IANA time zone database
In the IANA time zone database Antigua and Barbuda has the following time zone:
America/Antigua (AG)

References

Antigua and Barbuda
Time in Antigua and Barbuda